Simone Missiroli (born 23 May 1986) is an  Italian footballer who plays as a midfielder.

Club career

Reggina
A native of Reggio Calabria, he made his Serie A debut with the local team Reggina on 24 April 2005 against Brescia Calcio. He also spent the 2008–09 season on loan at Treviso, and returned to Reggina to help his hometown club in their 2009–10 Serie B campaign. In January 2011 he left for Cagliari in a temporary deal for €1 million.

Sassuolo
On 4 January 2012, Missiroli moved to Serie B side U.S. Sassuolo Calcio for €3.5 million. Before leaving Reggina, Missiroli was one of the team topscorers of the 2011–12 season as a playmaker. Missiroli was also named the captain of the team, wearing the armband on several occasions, such as the game against Sassuolo.

On 11 January 2016, he signed a new -year contract with Sassuolo.

SPAL
On 17 August 2018, Missiroli signed with Serie A club SPAL.

Cesena
On 26 September 2021 joined Serie C side Cesena on a deal until the end of the season.

International career
Missiroli played two matches for Italy U20 team.

Career statistics

References

External links
http://www.gazzetta.it/speciali/2008/calcio/Players/player_p191243.shtml

1986 births
Living people
Sportspeople from Reggio Calabria
Italian footballers
Reggina 1914 players
Treviso F.B.C. 1993 players
Cagliari Calcio players
U.S. Sassuolo Calcio players
U.S. Cremonese players
S.P.A.L. players
Serie A players
Serie B players
Association football midfielders
Serie C players
Cesena F.C. players
Italy youth international footballers
Footballers from Calabria